Loreto Cucchiarelli (born 21 July 1943) is an Italian former rugby union player and a current coach. He played as flanker.

Biography
Cucchiarelli was born in Borgorose, in the province of Rieti. He played for L'Aquila Rugby, where he won the team first National Championship title in 1966/67.

He had 2 caps for Italy, in 1966 and 1967, never scoring. He also played for Italy A and the U-23 National Team.

He is more successful as a coach. He won two National Championship titles for L'Aquila Rugby in 1980/81 and 1981/82 and a Cup of Italy, in 1981.
He later would be in charge of Italy National Teams in all categories, leading the first side from 1988 to 1989.

He was nominated Sports Director of L'Aquila Rugby for the season of 2007/08.

External links
Loreto Cucchiarelli Data
Loreto Cucchiarelli International Statistics

1943 births
Living people
Sportspeople from the Province of Rieti
Italian rugby union players
Italian rugby union coaches
Italy national rugby team coaches
Italy international rugby union players
Rugby union flankers